Kevin Charles Parker (born December 26, 1973)  is an American politician of the Republican Party. He is a former member of the Washington House of Representatives, having represented the 6th Legislative District from 2009 to 2017. Parker currently owns nine Dutch Bros Coffee franchises in the Spokane, Washington area and teaches at Whitworth University's undergraduate and graduate business schools.

Awards 
 2014 Guardians of Small Business award. Presented by NFIB.

References

1973 births
Living people
Republican Party members of the Washington House of Representatives